Capital punishment in Kyrgyzstan has been abolished.

On December 5, 1998, President Askar Akayev established a two-year moratorium, which was subsequently renewed annually.

On June 27, 2007 President Kurmanbek Bakiyev signed legislation amending Kyrgyzstan's Criminal Code and abolishing the death penalty.

The Kyrgyzstan constitution was amended to state that:

"No one in the Kyrgyz Republic can be deprived of life."

References

Kyrgyzstan
Human rights abuses in Kyrgyzstan